Mithridates IV (also spelled Mithradates IV;  Mihrdāt) was a Parthian king from to 57 to 54 BC. He was the son and successor of Phraates III. Mithridates IV's reign was marked by a dynastic struggle with his younger brother, Orodes II, who eventually emerged victorious and had Mithridates IV executed, thus succeeding him.

Etymology 
Mithridates is the Greek attestation of the Iranian name Mihrdāt, meaning "given by Mithra", the name of the ancient Iranian sun god. The name itself is derived from Old Iranian Miθra-dāta-.

Biography 
Mithridates IV was a son of Phraates III, under whom he served as the ruler of the central province of Media. In 57 BC, Mithridates murdered his father with the assistance of his younger brother Orodes. However, the two brothers quickly fell out, and Orodes revolted with the support of the Suren clan. They both assumed the title of King of Kings to demonstrate their claims of superiority over each other.

This changed the meaning of the title; originally being used as a symbol of political dominance over other realms, the title became known as a symbol of power and legitimacy for contenders in a royal family. Mithridates IV was forced to flee from to Roman Syria. He took refuge with Aulus Gabinius, the Roman proconsul and governor of Syria. Mithridates IV then returned to invade Parthia with Gabinius in support. The Roman proconsul marched with Mithridates IV to the Euphrates, but turned back to restore another ruler, Ptolemy XII Auletes of Egypt, to his throne. Despite losing his Roman support, Mithridates IV advanced into Mesopotamia and managed to conquer Babylonia. He ousted Orodes and briefly restored his reign as king in 55 BC, minting coins in Seleucia until 54 BC.

However, king Mithridates IV was besieged by Orodes' general, Surena, in Seleucia, and after a prolonged resistance, offered battle to Orodes' forces and was defeated. Mithridates IV was afterwards executed in 54 BC by Orodes.

Notes

References

Sources 
 .

Further reading
 

54 BC deaths
Year of birth unknown
Executed monarchs
1st-century BC Parthian monarchs
Parthian Dark Age
1st-century BC Babylonian kings